Balkin is the surname of the following people:
Amy Balkin, American artist
Jack Balkin (born 1956), American legal scholar
Lee Balkin (born 1961), American high jumper
Rosalie Balkin (born 1950), Australian maritime lawyer and international legal scholar

See also
Balkans